Adyson do Nascimento Soares (born 22 September 2005), simply known as Adyson, is a Brazilian professional footballer who plays as a forward for América Mineiro.

Career
Born in Coroatá, Maranhão, Adyson joined América Mineiro's youth setup in 2018. On 8 November 2021, aged just 16, he signed his first professional contract with the club.

Adyson made his first team debut on 25 January 2022, coming on as a second-half substitute for fellow youth graduate Gustavinho in a 1–2 Campeonato Mineiro away loss against Caldense.

Career statistics

References

2005 births
Living people
Sportspeople from Maranhão
Brazilian footballers
Association football forwards
América Futebol Clube (MG) players